Frank Street (31 May 1870 – 7 July 1916) was an English cricketer. He played for Essex between 1898 and 1899. He was killed in action during World War I.

References

External links

1870 births
1916 deaths
British military personnel killed in World War I
English cricketers
Essex cricketers
Sportspeople from Kensington
British Army personnel of World War I
Military personnel from London
British Army soldiers